Tauras Stumbrys (8 January 1970 – 16 October 2004) was a Lithuanian professional basketball player. He played the point guard position and was a longtime member of Žalgiris Kaunas. With Žalgiris he won the Lithuanian Basketball League five times.

Death
During a Hidruva-Atletas and Žalgiris LKL matchup in October 2004, Stumbrys suffered a myocardial infarction and lost consciousness. Paramedics and teammates attempted to revive him, but to no avail. He was pronounced dead later that night. Stumbrys had played 8 minutes and scored 3 points in his last match.

References

1970 births
2004 deaths
BC Žalgiris players
Hapoel Haifa B.C. players
Lithuanian men's basketball players
Point guards
Basketball players from Kaunas